Olfactory receptor 6A2 is a protein that in humans is encoded by the OR6A2 gene. It is Class II (tetrapod-specific) olfactory receptor and a rhodopsin-like receptor.

Function 

Olfactory receptors interact with odorant molecules in the nose, to initiate a neuronal response that triggers the perception of a smell. The olfactory receptor proteins are members of a large family of G-protein-coupled receptors (GPCR) arising from single coding-exon genes. Olfactory receptors share a 7-transmembrane domain structure with many neurotransmitters and hormone receptors and are responsible for the recognition and G protein-mediated transduction of odorant signals.

Clinical significance 

Variation in the OR6A2 gene has been identified as a likely cause of why some people enjoy the smell and taste of coriander (also known as cilantro) while others have exactly the opposite reaction to the point of repulsion. Depending on ancestry, somewhere between 3% and 21% of the population associate it with unpleasant taste, including a combination of soap and vomit, or say that it is similar to the foul smelling odor emitted by stinkbugs. This is due to the presence of aldehyde chemicals, which are present in soap, various detergents, coriander, several species of stinkbugs and cinnamon.

See also
 Olfactory receptor

References

Further reading

External links 
 

Olfactory receptors